"This Time" (In the Right Direction) is a song by New Zealand band Dragon, released in 1976, and included on their album Sunshine. It was released as a single in June 1976, and peaked at No. 26 on the Australian national singles chart, remaining on the chart for 23 weeks

B-side
The b-side, "The Dreaded Moroczy Bind", did not appear on any of Dragon's studio albums but was included on Greatest Hits Vol. 1 and some subsequent compilations. Chess-fan Hewson named it after the Maróczy Bind, a pawn formation.

Track listing 
 This Time (Marc Hunter, Neil Storey, Paul Hewson, Robert Taylor, Todd Hunter) – 3:05
 The Dreaded Moroczy Bind (Marc Hunter, Neil Storey, Paul Hewson, Robert Taylor, Todd Hunter) – 3:24

Charts

Personnel 
 Paul Hewson – keyboards
 Marc Hunter — Vocals
 Todd Hunter — bass guitar
 Neil Storey – drums
 Robert M. Taylor – Guitars (electric, acoustic)

Production
 Producer – Peter Dawkins

References

External links
Dragon – This Time (Vinyl)
45 Cat
Dragon – This Time (1976) @ Youtube

1976 singles
1976 songs
Dragon (band) songs
Portrait Records singles
CBS Records singles
Songs written by Marc Hunter
Songs written by Todd Hunter
Song recordings produced by Peter Dawkins (musician)